Srževica is a settlement in the Municipality of Šentjur, eastern Slovenia. It lies in the hills east of Ponikva. The railway line from Ljubljana to Maribor runs along the northern edge of the settlement's territory.  The settlement, and the entire municipality, are included in the Savinja Statistical Region, which is in the Slovenian portion of the historical Duchy of Styria.

References

External links

Srževica at Geopedia

Populated places in the Municipality of Šentjur